The 2020 ACC women's basketball tournament, which concluded the 2019–20 season of the Atlantic Coast Conference, was held at Greensboro Coliseum in Greensboro, North Carolina, from March 4–8, 2020. NC State won the tournament and with it the ACC's automatic bid to the 2020 NCAA Women's Division I Basketball Tournament.

Seeds

Source:

Schedule

Bracket

Source:

Game Summaries

First round

Second round

Quarterfinals

Semifinals

Final

All-Tournament Teams

See also

 2020 ACC men's basketball tournament

References

Tournament
ACC women's basketball tournament
Women's sports in North Carolina
College sports in North Carolina
Basketball competitions in Greensboro, North Carolina
ACC women's basketball tournament